The Texas Tech Administrative Law Journal was a student-run law review that discussed developments and issues in Texas administrative law. It was established in 2000 and was sponsored by the Administrative and Public Law Section of the State Bar of Texas. Its staff consisted of second- and third-year law students from the Texas Tech University School of Law.

The journal compiled articles in two annual books. Prior publications may be accessed via Westlaw, LexisNexis, and HeinOnline.

Selection
The journal selected new members based upon their performance in a write-on competition open to first-year students. The Journal would then choose twenty individuals for membership.

History
The journal was founded in 2000 and was the law school's second-oldest journal. The journal ceased publication after the 2018-2019 school year.

External links
 
 Texas Administrative and Public Law Section Homepage

Texas Tech University School of Law
American law journals
Administrative law journals